Mohr's circle is a two-dimensional graphical representation of the  transformation law for the Cauchy stress tensor.

Mohr's circle is often used in calculations relating to mechanical engineering for materials' strength, geotechnical engineering for strength of soils, and structural engineering for strength of built structures. It is also used for calculating stresses in many planes by reducing them to vertical and horizontal components. These are called principal planes in which principal stresses are calculated; Mohr's circle can also be used to find the principal planes and the principal stresses in a graphical representation, and is one of the easiest ways to do so.

After performing a stress analysis on a material body assumed as a continuum, the components of the Cauchy stress tensor at a particular material point are known with respect to a coordinate system. The Mohr circle is then used to determine graphically the stress components acting on a rotated coordinate system, i.e., acting on a differently oriented plane passing through that point.

The abscissa and ordinate  of each point on the circle are the magnitudes of the normal stress and shear stress components, respectively, acting on the rotated coordinate system. In other words, the circle is the locus of points that represent the state of stress on individual planes at all their orientations, where the axes represent the principal axes of the stress element.

19th-century German engineer Karl Culmann was the first to conceive a graphical representation for stresses while considering longitudinal and vertical stresses in horizontal beams during bending. His work inspired fellow German engineer Christian Otto Mohr (the circle's namesake), who extended it to both two- and three-dimensional stresses and developed a failure criterion based on the stress circle.

Alternative graphical methods for the representation of the stress state at a point include the Lamé's stress ellipsoid and Cauchy's stress quadric.

The Mohr circle can be applied to any symmetric 2x2 tensor matrix, including the strain and moment of inertia tensors.

Motivation

Internal forces are produced between the particles of a deformable object, assumed as a continuum, as a reaction to applied external forces, i.e., either surface forces or body forces. This reaction follows from Euler's laws of motion for a continuum, which are equivalent to Newton's laws of motion for a particle. A measure of the intensity of these internal forces is called stress. Because the object is assumed as a continuum, these internal forces are distributed continuously within the volume of the object.

In engineering, e.g., structural, mechanical, or geotechnical, the stress distribution within an object, for instance stresses in a rock mass around a tunnel, airplane wings, or building columns, is determined through a stress analysis. Calculating the stress distribution implies the determination of stresses at every point (material particle) in the object. According to Cauchy, the stress at any point in an object (Figure 2), assumed as a continuum, is completely defined by the nine stress components  of a second order tensor of type (2,0) known as the Cauchy stress tensor, :

After the stress distribution within the object has been determined with respect to a coordinate system , it may be necessary to calculate the components of the stress tensor at a particular material point  with respect to a rotated coordinate system , i.e., the stresses acting on a plane with a different orientation passing through that point of interest  —forming an angle with the coordinate system  (Figure 3). For example, it is of interest to find the maximum normal stress and maximum shear stress, as well as the orientation of the planes where they act upon. To achieve this, it is necessary to perform a tensor transformation under a rotation of the coordinate system. From the definition of tensor, the Cauchy stress tensor obeys the tensor transformation law. A graphical representation of this transformation law for the Cauchy stress tensor is the Mohr circle for stress.

Mohr's circle for two-dimensional state of stress

In two dimensions, the stress tensor at a given material point  with respect to any two perpendicular directions is completely defined by only three stress components. From the balance of angular momentum, the symmetry of the Cauchy stress tensor can be demonstrated. This symmetry implies that . Thus, the Cauchy stress tensor can be written as:

The rotated coordinate system  makes an angle  with the original coordinate system .

Equation of the Mohr circle
To derive the equation of the Mohr circle for the two-dimensional cases of plane stress and plane strain, first consider a two-dimensional infinitesimal material element around a material point  (Figure 4), with a unit area in the direction parallel to the - plane, i.e., perpendicular to the page or screen.

From equilibrium of forces on the infinitesimal element, the magnitudes of the normal stress  and the shear stress  are given by:

{| class="toccolours collapsible collapsed" width="60%" style="text-align:left"
!Derivation of Mohr's circle parametric equations - Equilibrium of forces
|-

However, knowing that

we obtain

However, knowing that

we obtain

|}

{| class="toccolours collapsible collapsed" width="60%" style="text-align:left"
!Derivation of Mohr's circle parametric equations - Tensor transformation
|-
|The stress tensor transformation law can be stated as

However, knowing that

we obtain

However, knowing that

we obtain

|}

These two equations are the parametric equations of the Mohr circle. This means that by choosing a coordinate system with abscissa  and ordinate , giving values to the parameter  will place the points obtained lying on a circle.

Eliminating the parameter  from these parametric equations will yield the non-parametric equation of the Mohr circle. Thus we have

where

This is the equation of a circle (the Mohr circle) of the form

with radius  centered at a point with coordinates   in the  coordinate system.

Sign conventions 
There are two separate sets of sign conventions that need to be considered when using the Mohr Circle: One sign convention for stress components in the "physical space", and another for stress components in the "Mohr-Circle-space". In addition, within each of the two set of sign conventions, the engineering mechanics (structural engineering and mechanical engineering) literature follows a different sign convention from the geomechanics literature. There is no standard sign convention, and the choice of a particular sign convention is influenced by convenience for calculation and interpretation for the particular problem in hand. A more detailed explanation of these sign conventions is presented below.

The previous derivation for the equation of the Mohr Circle using Figure 4 follows the engineering mechanics sign convention. The engineering mechanics sign convention will be used for this article.

Physical-space sign convention 
From the convention of the Cauchy stress tensor (Figure 3 and Figure 4), the first subscript in the stress components denotes the face on which the stress component acts, and the second subscript indicates the direction of the stress component. Thus  is the shear stress acting on the face with normal vector in the positive direction of the -axis, and in the positive direction of the -axis.

In the physical-space sign convention, positive normal stresses are outward to the plane of action (tension), and negative normal stresses are inward to the plane of action (compression) (Figure 5).

In the physical-space sign convention, positive shear stresses act on positive faces of the material element in the positive direction of an axis. Also, positive shear stresses act on negative faces of the material element in the negative direction of an axis. A positive face has its normal vector in the positive direction of an axis, and a negative face has its normal vector in the negative direction of an axis. Similarly, the respective opposite shear stresses  and  acting in the negative faces have a negative sign because they act in the negative direction of the -axis and -axis, respectively.

Mohr-circle-space sign convention 

In the Mohr-circle-space sign convention, normal stresses have the same sign as normal stresses in the physical-space sign convention: positive normal stresses act outward to the plane of action, and negative normal stresses act inward to the plane of action.

Shear stresses, however, have a different convention in the Mohr-circle space compared to the convention in the physical space. In the Mohr-circle-space sign convention, positive shear stresses rotate the material element in the counterclockwise direction, and negative shear stresses rotate the material in the clockwise direction. This way, the shear stress component  is positive in the Mohr-circle space, and the shear stress component  is negative in the Mohr-circle space.

Two options exist for drawing the Mohr-circle space, which produce a mathematically correct Mohr circle:

 Positive shear stresses are plotted upward (Figure 5, sign convention #1)
 Positive shear stresses are plotted downward, i.e., the -axis is inverted (Figure 5, sign convention #2).

Plotting positive shear stresses upward makes the angle  on the Mohr circle have a positive rotation clockwise, which is opposite to the physical space convention. That is why some authors prefer plotting positive shear stresses downward, which makes the angle  on the Mohr circle have a positive rotation counterclockwise, similar to the physical space convention for shear stresses.

To overcome the "issue" of having the shear stress axis downward in the Mohr-circle space, there is an alternative sign convention where positive shear stresses are assumed to rotate the material element in the clockwise direction and negative shear stresses are assumed to rotate the material element in the counterclockwise direction (Figure 5, option 3). This way, positive shear stresses are plotted upward in the Mohr-circle space and the angle  has a positive rotation counterclockwise in the Mohr-circle space. This alternative sign convention produces a circle that is identical to the sign convention #2 in Figure 5 because a positive shear stress  is also a counterclockwise shear stress, and both are plotted downward. Also, a negative shear stress  is a clockwise shear stress, and both are plotted upward.

This article follows the engineering mechanics sign convention for the physical space and the alternative sign convention for the Mohr-circle space (sign convention #3 in Figure 5)

Drawing Mohr's circle 

 Draw the Cartesian coordinate system  with a horizontal -axis and a vertical  -axis.
 Draw the Mohr Circle. The centre  of the circle is the midpoint of the diameter line , which corresponds to the intersection of this line with the  axis.

Finding principal normal stresses 

The magnitude of the major principal stress  is always the greatest absolute value of the abscissa of any of these two points. Likewise, the magnitude of the minor principal stress  is always the lowest absolute value of the abscissa of these two points. As expected, the ordinates of these two points are zero, corresponding to the magnitude of the shear stress components on the principal planes. Alternatively, the values of the principal stresses can be found by

where the magnitude of the average normal stress  is the abscissa of the centre , given by

and the length of the radius  of the circle (based on the equation of a circle passing through two points), is given by

Finding maximum and minimum  shear stresses 
The maximum and minimum shear stresses correspond to the ordinates of the highest and lowest points on the circle, respectively. These points are located at the intersection of the circle with the vertical line passing through the center of the circle, . Thus, the magnitude of the maximum and minimum shear stresses are equal to the value of the circle's radius

Finding stress components on an arbitrary plane 
These stress components act in two perpendicular planes  and  passing through  as shown in Figure 5 and 6. For this, two approaches can be used: the double angle, and the Pole or origin of planes.

Double angle 

The double angle approach relies on the fact that the angle  between the normal vectors to any two physical planes passing through  (Figure 4) is half the angle between two lines joining their corresponding stress points  on the Mohr circle and the centre of the circle.

Pole or origin of planes 

The second approach involves the determination of a point on the Mohr circle called the pole or the origin of planes. Any straight line drawn from the pole will intersect the Mohr circle at a point that represents the state of stress on a plane inclined at the same orientation (parallel) in space as that line. The intersection of any of these two lines with the Mohr circle is the pole. Once the pole has been determined, to find the state of stress on a plane making an angle  with the vertical, or in other words a plane having its normal vector forming an angle  with the horizontal plane, then we can draw a line from the pole parallel to that plane (See Figure 7). The normal and shear stresses on that plane are then the coordinates of the point of intersection between the line and the Mohr circle.

Finding the orientation of the principal planes 
The orientation of the planes where the maximum and minimum principal stresses act, also known as principal planes, can be determined by measuring in the Mohr circle the angles ∠BOC and ∠BOE, respectively, and taking half of each of those angles.

Angles  and  can also be found from the following equation

This equation can be derived directly from the geometry of the circle, or by making the parametric equation of the circle for  equal to zero (the shear stress in the principal planes is always zero).

Example 

Assume a material element under a state of stress as shown in Figure 8 and Figure 9, with the plane of one of its sides oriented 10° with respect to the horizontal plane.
Using the Mohr circle, find:

 The orientation of their planes of action.
 The maximum shear stresses and orientation of their planes of action.
 The stress components on a horizontal plane.

Check the answers using the stress transformation formulas or the stress transformation law.

Solution:
Following the engineering mechanics sign convention for the physical space (Figure 5), the stress components for the material element in this example are:

.
Following the steps for drawing the Mohr circle for this particular state of stress, we first draw a Cartesian coordinate system  with the -axis upward.

We then plot two points A(50,40) and B(-10,-40), representing the state of stress at plane A and B as show in both Figure 8 and Figure 9. These points follow the engineering mechanics sign convention for the Mohr-circle space (Figure 5), which assumes positive normals stresses outward from the material element, and positive shear stresses on each plane rotating the material element clockwise. This way, the shear stress acting on plane B is negative and the shear stress acting on plane A is positive.
The diameter of the circle is the line joining point A and B. The centre of the circle is the intersection of this line with the -axis. Knowing both the location of the centre and length of the diameter, we are able to plot the Mohr circle for this particular state of stress.

The abscissas of both points E and C (Figure 8 and Figure 9) intersecting the -axis are the magnitudes of the minimum and maximum normal stresses, respectively; the ordinates of both points E and C are the magnitudes of the shear stresses acting on both the minor and major principal planes, respectively, which is zero for principal planes.

Even though the idea for using the Mohr circle is to graphically find different stress components by actually measuring the coordinates for different points on the circle, it is more convenient to confirm the results analytically. Thus, the radius and the abscissa of the centre of the circle are

and the principal stresses are

The coordinates for both points H and G (Figure 8 and Figure 9) are the magnitudes of the minimum and maximum shear stresses, respectively; the abscissas for both points H and G are the magnitudes for the normal stresses acting on the same planes where the minimum and maximum shear stresses act, respectively.
The magnitudes of the minimum and maximum shear stresses can be found analytically by

and the normal stresses acting on the same planes where the minimum and maximum shear stresses act are equal to 

We can choose to either use the double angle approach (Figure 8) or the Pole approach (Figure 9) to find the orientation of the principal normal stresses and principal shear stresses.

Using the double angle approach we measure the angles ∠BOC and  ∠BOE in the Mohr Circle (Figure 8) to find double the angle the major principal stress and the minor principal stress make with plane B in the physical space. To obtain a more accurate value for these angles, instead of manually measuring the angles, we can use the analytical expression

One solution is: .
From inspection of Figure 8, this value corresponds to the angle ∠BOE. Thus, the minor principal angle is

Then, the major principal angle is

Using the Pole approach, we first localize the Pole or origin of planes. For this, we draw through point A on the Mohr circle a line inclined 10° with the horizontal, or, in other words, a line parallel to plane A where  acts. The Pole is where this line intersects the Mohr circle (Figure 9). To confirm the location of the Pole, we could draw a line through point B on the Mohr circle parallel to the plane B where  acts. This line would also intersect the Mohr circle at the Pole (Figure 9).

From the Pole, we draw lines to different points on the Mohr circle. The coordinates of the points where these lines intersect the Mohr circle indicate the stress components acting on a plane in the physical space having the same inclination as the line. For instance, the line from the Pole to point C in the circle has the same inclination as the plane in the physical space where  acts. This plane makes an angle of 63.435° with plane B, both in the Mohr-circle space and in the physical space. In the same way, lines are traced from the Pole to points E, D, F, G and H to find the stress components on planes with the same orientation.

Mohr's circle for a general three-dimensional state of stresses 

To construct the Mohr circle for a general three-dimensional case of stresses at a point, the values of the principal stresses  and their principal directions  must be first evaluated.

 as the denominator  and 
 as the denominator  and 
 as the denominator  and 

These expressions can be rewritten as

These equations for the Mohr circles show that all admissible stress points  lie on these circles or within the shaded area enclosed by them (see Figure 10). Stress points  satisfying the equation for circle  lie on, or outside circle . Stress points  satisfying the equation for circle  lie on, or inside circle . And finally, stress points  satisfying the equation for circle  lie on, or outside circle .

See also 
 Critical plane analysis

References

Bibliography

External links

  Mohr's Circle and more circles by Rebecca Brannon
 DoITPoMS Teaching and Learning Package- "Stress Analysis and Mohr's Circle"

Classical mechanics
Elasticity (physics)
Solid mechanics
Mechanics